Catherine Anselm Gleason (November 24/25, 1865 – January 9, 1933) was an American engineer and businesswoman known for her accomplishments in the field of engineering and for her philanthropy. Starting at a young age, she managed several important roles in the family-owned Gleason Works in Rochester, New York, and later used her experience to launch a successful career in finance and construction. Through a combination of formal education and self-learning she earned the title of engineer and became the first woman elected to the American Society of Mechanical Engineers in 1914. Gleason is the namesake of the Kate Gleason College of Engineering at the Rochester Institute of Technology.

Early life and education
Catherine Anselm Gleason was born on November 25, 1865, in Rochester, New York. She was the first of four children of William and Ellen McDermott Gleason, emigrants from Ireland. William was the owner of a machine tool company, later named Gleason Works. He developed a machine to automatically plane bevel gears in 1874, and Gleason Works became a prominent gear-cutting company. When Kate was 11, her stepbrother Tom died of typhoid fever, causing hardship for both the family and the company, where he had assisted William. Shortly after, she began working for her father to fill Tom's role, and became a bookkeeper for the company. 

In 1884, at the age of 19, Gleason enrolled in the Cornell Mechanical Arts program, becoming the first woman in the university's engineering program. She was unable to complete her studies at Cornell due to renewed trouble at the Gleason factory. William had hired a man to replace her in the business, but the firm started struggling financially and he could no longer afford to pay her replacement. At his request, she returned to Rochester. She was never able to return to full-time studies to complete a degree, but through training and self-learning she earned the title of engineer and was recognized for her accomplishments. She received some further education as a part-time student at the Sibley College of Engraving and The Mechanics Institute (later renamed the Rochester Institute of Technology).

Gleason Works
Gleason resumed her work at Gleason Works and soon rose to new positions. She was named company secretary and treasurer, and additionally became a traveling salesperson. Demand for gears soared in the 1890s as automobile manufacturing began. In 1893, she toured Europe to expand the company's business, an early attempt at globalization by an American manufacturer, and succeeded at finding several new foreign customers. Today, nearly three quarters of the company's sales are international. She made a second European trip to represent the company at the Paris Exhibition of 1900, and remained chief salesperson until her exit from the company in 1913. A misconception arose that she, not her father, had invented the company's bevel planer, and was promoted by her acquaintance Henry Ford. 

Fred H. Colvin described Gleason in his memoirs as"a kind of Madame Curie of machine tools […] Kate spent her youth learning her father's business from the ground up, both in the shop and in the field, so that when she branched out for herself about 1895 as a saleswoman for her father's gear-cutting machines, she knew as much as any man in the business." In addition to her depth of knowledge, Gleason attributed her success in sales to her uniqueness in a male-dominated profession:"In those early days I was a freak; I talked of gears when a woman was not supposed to know what a gear was. It did me much good. For, no matter how much men disapproved of me, they were at least interested in seeing me, one distinct advantage I had over the ordinary salesman."She paid careful attention to her dress and public habits as well, often choosing outfits to emphasize her femininity, and claimed that customers would recall a dress or hat she wore during a sale years later. 

James Gleason, a later CEO of Gleason Corporation, credited most of the company's global expansion to her work as its representative.

The company's expansion necessitated larger facilities, and Gleason Works built new headquarters in 1904 and again in 1911. Gleason contributed to the design of both buildings and developed an interest in construction.

Later career
Due to conflicts with her family, Gleason left Gleason Works in 1913. She joined the Ingle Machine Company on January 1, 1914, when she was appointed the receiver of bankruptcy for the company, the first woman to be appointed to such a position by a bankruptcy court. Under her guidance she restored the company to profitability and repaid their outstanding debts. The company was returned to the stockholders before the end of 1915.

In 1918, Gleason was appointed the president of First National Bank of East Rochester when the previous president enlisted to serve in World War I. Her time at the bank was mostly concerned with real estate and construction projects. She helped launch eight companies, including a housing project in East Rochester named the Concrest Community. At Concrest, she began experimenting with concrete to build fireproof houses at an affordable cost, using a pouring method she developed and mass production methods learned from the Gleason Works. The Concrest homes were sold for a price of no more than $4,000. 

In the 1920s, Gleason traveled from Rochester for business opportunities in France, South Carolina, and California. She purchased and rebuilt a castle in Septmonts and built a library and movie theater in the town to commemorate the AEF. During this time period she also toured California to study adobe buildings. In 1924, she was consulted by the city of Berkeley, California, to help rebuild after a fire. In the late 1920s she began to build more poured concrete buildings in Sausalito, California, but the project was not as successful as her buildings in Rochester. At her winter home in Beaufort, South Carolina, she had plans to build a community of garden apartments for artists and writers, although only ten of these homes were completed at the time of her death.

Personal life
Ellen Gleason was a friend of fellow Rochesterian Susan B. Anthony, and Kate Gleason later cited Anthony as a source of advice on business and publicity. Gleason hosted Anthony for her 86th birthday in 1906, shortly before her death. Gleason was later a strong supporter of women's suffrage. In 1912, she pledged $1,200 to the National America Woman Suffrage Association, one of the largest pledges it received. Many of her personal writings testify to her and her father's contributions to women's suffrage.

Gleason pursued a number of philanthropic interests in the 1920s, making large donations to orphanages, libraries, and schools. In 1929, she donated a large property to the Rochester Institute of Technology.

Gleason viewed marriage as a hindrance to her professional life and she never married nor had children.

Death and legacy

In 1913, Gleason became the first woman elected to membership in the Verein Deutscher Ingenieure. The following year, she became the first woman elected to membership in the American Society of Mechanical Engineers, followed shortly after by Lydia Weld. Gleason represented the society at the World Conference on Power in Germany in 1930. For her work in construction, she also became the first female member of the American Concrete Institute.

Gleason died on January 9, 1933, of pneumonia, and was interred in Riverside Cemetery in Rochester. She bequeathed $348,000 of her $1.4 million estate to doctors and institutions in the Rochester area, including libraries and parks. 

The Gleason Corporation remains in operation and retains a strong connection with RIT. The Kate Gleason College of Engineering at RIT was named after her in 1998, following a $10 Million donation from the Gleason Corporation. An RIT residence hall, Kate Gleason Hall, is also named after her.  In 2010, RIT press published a collection of Gleason's letters.

Notes

References

Further reading

External links

 ASME biography

1865 births
1933 deaths
American women engineers
American women in business
Cornell University College of Engineering alumni
Rochester Institute of Technology alumni
American people of Irish descent
Deaths from pneumonia in New York (state)
Burials in New York (state)
Place of death missing
19th-century American engineers
20th-century American engineers
19th-century women engineers
20th-century women engineers
20th-century American women
19th-century American women
Businesspeople from Rochester, New York